The Brunei Fed Cup team represents Brunei in Fed Cup tennis competition and are governed by the Brunei Darussalam Tennis Association.  They have not competed since 1996.

History
Brunei competed in its first (and thus far, only) Fed Cup in 1996, losing all three of its Group II ties.

See also
Fed Cup
Brunei Davis Cup team

External links

Billie Jean King Cup teams
Fed Cup
Fed Cup